The City of Chester by-election of 15 November 1956 was held after the appointment of  Conservative Member of Parliament (MP) Basil Nield as Recorder of Manchester.

The seat was safe, having been won at the 1955 United Kingdom general election by over 11,000 votes

Result of the previous general election

Result of the by-election

References

1956 elections in the United Kingdom
1956 in England
November 1956 events in the United Kingdom
20th century in Cheshire
By-election, 1966
Politics of Chester
By-elections to the Parliament of the United Kingdom in Cheshire constituencies